(1573 – March 27, 1620) was a female warrior (onna-musha) during late-Sengoku period and early Edo period . Born the daughter of Honda Tadakatsu, she was adopted by Tokugawa Ieyasu, before marrying Sanada Nobuyuki. She is described as having been very beautiful, highly intelligent and skillful in fighting.

Life
Komatsuhime was known in her childhood as Inahime (稲姫) and also Onei (於小亥). After witnessing the martial prowess of the Sanada at the First Battle of Ueda Castle, she and her father were captivated by them. Tokugawa Ieyasu himself arranged for Komatsuhime to marry Sanada Nobuyuki, the son of the Sanada lord.

In 1600, when Nobuyuki had decided to cast his lot with the Tokugawa, his father Masayuki (who had not done so) was en route to Ueda Castle, accompanied by his other son, the famed Sanada Yukimura. The two stopped at Numata Castle, where Komatsuhime was managing affairs. Komatsuhime challenged Masayuki and Yukimura at the entrance of the Castle moments before of the Siege of Ueda. Masayuki relayed a message to her: "I want to see my grandchildren", and in response, the princess emerged, dressed in full battle attire, saying, "Since we have parted ways in this conflict, though you are my father-in-law I cannot allow you into this castle." Masayuki and Yukimura withdrew to a temple, Shōkaku-ji, and were surprised when they saw Komatsuhime (with her children) arrive soon after them, honoring Masayuki's wish.

After the Battle of Sekigahara, during Masayuki and Yukimura's exile, she took charge of sending them food and other daily necessities.

Komatsuhime was praised as a good wife and wise mother (ryōsai kenbo 良妻賢母). She died in Kōnosu, Musashi Province (the present-day city of Kōnosu in Saitama Prefecture) at age 47, while en route to the Kusatsu hot spring. Nobuyuki lamented her death, saying that "the light of my house has been extinguished." Her grave can be found there. Today, in the museum at Ueda Castle, visitors can see items that she used, including her palanquin.

Family 

 Father: Honda Tadakatsu
 Husband: Sanada Nobuyuki
 Children:
 Manhime (b. 1592)
 Sanada Nobumasa of Matsushiro Domain
 Sanada Nobushige (1599–1648).

Cultural references
Inahime is the namesake and partial inspiration for Princess Ina in the novel Mercy of the Elements.

Video games
 Samurai Warriors series
 Warriors Orochi series
 Pokémon Conquest (as Ina; her partner Pokémon are Prinplup and Empoleon)
 Sengoku Taisen

See also
Sanada Taiheiki, a Japanese drama
Sanada Maru, a Japanese drama

Notes

References
 "Tokugawa jūgodai shōgun-ke no fujintachi." Rekishi Dokuhon (August 1998), p. 217.
 Komatsuhime no Ikikata (in Japanese)
 Komatsuhime no Subete (in Japanese)
 Komatsuhime no Haka (in Japanese)

1573 births
1620 deaths
Japanese nobility
Japanese women in warfare
Women in 16th-century warfare
Tokugawa clan
Women of medieval Japan
People of Azuchi–Momoyama-period Japan
People of Edo-period Japan
16th-century Japanese people
17th-century Japanese people
Women in 17th-century warfare
16th-century Japanese women
17th-century Japanese women
Honda clan
Sanada clan